The 10th Mechanised Division is a division of the Syrian Arab Army, currently engaged in the Syrian Civil War.

In Lebanon in 1982, the 10th Armoured Division was deployed south of the Beirut-Damascus road, and inside Beirut, and consisted of the 76th and 91st Tank Brigades – equipped with T-62s and BMP-1s – and the 85th Mechanized Brigade, equipped with T-55s and BTR-60s. The division was also assigned control of the 20th Commando Battalion as well.

The same year the division was reported to have taken place in the 1982 Hama massacre.

In 2001 Richard Bennett's estimate of the Army order of battle reported that the 10th Mechanized Division was headquartered in Shtoura, Lebanon, part of the 2nd Corps. Its main units [were in 2001] deployed to control the strategic Beirut-Damascus highway with the 123rd Mechanized Brigade near Yanta, the 51st Armored Brigade near Zahle in the Beqaa Valley and the 85th Armored Brigade, deployed around the complex of positions at Dahr al-Baidar.

In Syria, the division was reported to have become involved in the two battles in al-Qusayr starting on 19 May 2013, as part of the larger al-Qusayr offensive, launched in early April 2013 by the Syrian Army and the Lebanese militia Hezbollah, with the aim of capturing the villages around the rebel-held town of al-Qusayr and ultimately launching an attack on the town itself. al-Qusayr is in Homs Governorate, near the border with Lebanon. The region was strategically important as a supply route for rebels fighting Syrian government forces in Homs, and for its proximity to government-supporting areas along the coast.

In course of the Ithriyah-Raqqa offensive in 2016, the division's chief-of-staff, Major General Hassan Saado, was killed.

Battle Order 
In 2013 Holliday estimated the division included the 18th, 62nd, and 85th Mechanised Brigade, and the 56th Armoured Brigade.

References 

Divisions of Syria